Kusaj may refer to:
 Kusaj, West Azerbaijan
 Kusaj-e Olya, Zanjan Province
 Kusaj-e Sofla, Zanjan Province